Kelly Anne Shepherd (born 1970) is an Australian botanist, who has published some 91 names.

Career
Shepherd earned a B.Sc. (Hon) in 1992 with a thesis entitled "Faecal Analysis of Mammalian Herbivores in the Perup Forest, Western Australia." and a Ph.D. ("Systematic Analysis of the Australian Salicornioideae (Chenopodiaceae)" in 2005, both from  the University of Western Australia.

From 2004 to 2005 she was a research scientist with the University of Western Australia and Botanic Gardens and Parks Authority. In 2006 she was a post doctoral researcher at the  UK Millennium Seed Bank, working on seed dormancy on Australian species with undifferentiated species. From 2006 to 2009, she was a research scientist with the Western Australian Herbarium, where, since September 2009, she has been working as a senior research scientist.

Selected publications

See also
:Category:Taxa named by Kelly Anne Shepherd

References

1970 births
20th-century Australian botanists
Living people
21st-century Australian botanists
20th-century Australian women scientists